The Tipperary–Waterford rivalry is a hurling rivalry between Irish county teams Tipperary and Waterford.
Both teams play in the Munster Senior Hurling Championship and the All-Ireland Senior Hurling Championship. 

They have met in the All-Ireland Championship on four occasions with Waterford winning three times, the 2006 Quarter-Final, 2008 Semi-Final and the 2021 Quarter-Final, while Tipperary were successful in the 2010 Semi-Final.

All-Ireland Championship meetings

Munster Final meetings

References

External links
Tipperary v Waterford all-time results

Waterford
Waterford county hurling team rivalries